Lorin Cone Collins Jr. (August 1, 1848 – October 19, 1940) was an American politician and judge from Connecticut. A graduate of Northwestern University, Collins entered politics at a young age and was elected to the Illinois House of Representatives. He served three two-year terms in the lower house, the last of which he was Speaker of the House. Collins was appointed as the Circuit Court of Cook County in 1884, serving until 1893. In 1905, Collins was appointed to the Supreme Court of the Panama Canal Zone.

Biography
Lorin Cone Collins Jr. was born in Windsor, Connecticut, on August 1, 1848. His namesake father was a Methodist Episcopal preacher. In 1852, the Collinses moved to St. Paul, Minnesota. Collins attended the preparatory school at Ohio Wesleyan University. He moved to Chicago, Illinois, when he was twenty, then attended Northwestern University. Collins studied law under Clarkson & Van Schaack in Chicago and was admitted to the bar in 1874.

Collins focused on politics for his career. In 1878, Collins was elected to the Illinois House of Representatives as a Republican. He was re-elected in 1880 and 1882, serving as Speaker of the House for the latter term. Collins was appointed Judge of the Circuit Court of Cook County in 1884, completing the unexpired term of William Henry Barnum. He was re-elected to this seat to five-year terms in 1885 and 1891. He resigned in November 1893 to focus on his private law practice and later moved to Wheaton. Collins was appointed an associate justice to the Supreme Court of the Panama Canal Zone in 1905.

Collins married Nellie Robb in 1873. They had three surviving children: George R., Lorin C. III, and Grace. He was active in Freemasonry and was a Knight Templar. He was also a member of the Union League Club of Chicago. Collins died in at the George's home in Sawyer, Michigan, on October 19, 1940.

References

1848 births
1940 deaths
Judges of the United States District Court for the Canal Zone
United States federal judges appointed by Theodore Roosevelt
Lawyers from Chicago
Politicians from Chicago
Northwestern University alumni
Politicians from Saint Paul, Minnesota
People from Wheaton, Illinois
People from Windsor, Connecticut
Speakers of the Illinois House of Representatives
Republican Party members of the Illinois House of Representatives